The Minister of Employment is a cabinet portfolio in New Zealand which was first established in 1931 and was in use until 1938 before being used in several separate increments. It was revived from 1946 to 1954 and was again reconstituted in 1984.

The current minister is Carmel Sepuloni.

List of ministers
The following ministers have held the office of Minister of Employment.

Key

Notes

References  

Lists of government ministers of New Zealand